Jim Thomas may refer to:

Jim Thomas (basketball) (born 1960), American basketball player
Jim Thomas (executive) (born 1959), American businessman
Jim Thomas (gridiron football) (1938–2015), running back who played nine seasons in the Canadian Football League
Jim Thomas (poet) (1930–2009), Romanian poet
Jim Thomas (screenwriter), American screenwriter
Jim Thomas (tennis) (born 1974), American tennis player
Jim Thomas (computer scientist) (1946–2010), American computer scientist
Jimmy Thomas (American football) (1947–2017), National Football League running back

See also
James Thomas (disambiguation)